Olan Guy Ruble (February 17, 1906 – November 11, 1982) was an American football, basketball, and baseball coach and college athletics administrator. He served as the head football coach at Iowa Wesleyan College from 1942 to 1948. Ruble was also the head basketball coach at Iowa Wesleyan from 1941 to 1947 and the school's head baseball coach from 1943 to 1949.

Head coaching record

College football

References

External links
 

1906 births
1982 deaths
American men's basketball players
Iowa Wesleyan Tigers athletic directors
Iowa Wesleyan Tigers baseball coaches
Iowa Wesleyan Tigers football coaches
Iowa Wesleyan Tigers men's basketball coaches
Simpson Storm football players
Simpson Storm men's basketball players
High school basketball coaches in the United States
People from Clinton, Iowa
Coaches of American football from Iowa
Players of American football from Iowa
Baseball coaches from Iowa
Basketball coaches from Iowa
Basketball players from Iowa